Chen Ya-li (born 2 April 1969) is a Taiwanese sprinter. She competed in the women's 100 metres at the 1988 Summer Olympics.

References

External links
 

1969 births
Living people
Athletes (track and field) at the 1988 Summer Olympics
Taiwanese female sprinters
Olympic athletes of Taiwan
Place of birth missing (living people)
Olympic female sprinters